is a railway station on the Banetsu West Line in the city of  Aizuwakamatsu, Fukushima Prefecture,  Japan, operated by East Japan Railway Company (JR East).

Lines

Station layout
Dōjima Station has one side platform serving a single bi-directional track. There is no station building, and the station is unattended.

History
Dōjima Station opened on November 1, 1934. The station was absorbed into the JR East network upon the privatization of the Japanese National Railways (JNR) on April 1, 1987.

Surrounding area
 Dōjima Post Office

See also
 List of railway stations in Japan

External links

 JR East station information 

Railway stations in Fukushima Prefecture
Ban'etsu West Line
Railway stations in Japan opened in 1934
Aizuwakamatsu